Diana L. Mercer (born March 10, 1964) works in the field of divorce mediation and is the founder of Peace Talks Mediation Services in Los Angeles, California.  Mercer is also the co-author of Your Divorce Advisor: A Lawyer and a Psychologist Guide You Through the Legal and Emotional Landscape of Divorce. (Fireside, 2001).

Career
Mercer earned her Bachelor of Arts and Juris Doctor degrees from Indiana University in 1985 and 1988 respectively.  In 1993 she became a founding partner at Noyes & Mercer, P.C., a firm specializing in litigation and mediation of family law matters. Mercer left Noyes & Mercer, P.C. in 2000 and founded Peace Talks Mediation Services, Inc., a mediation firm dedicated to providing constructive, forward-thinking alternatives to litigation in family law conflicts.  Peace Talks is one of the first firms to team both a neutral attorney and a therapist as co-mediators during mediation sessions, dynamically integrating two important facets of the mediation process.

From 2001 to 2003, Diana Mercer served as an adjunct professor in the Psychology Department at the University of La Verne. She's taught graduate level courses in Mediation, Conflict Resolution, and Family Law.

In June 2001, she began serving as a co-trainer at Mosten Mediation Training. In this position, Mercer continues to teach mediation theories and techniques in an interactive training environment.

In 2006, she graduated from the Management Development for Entrepreneurs (MDE) Program at UCLA Anderson School of Management

Mercer is admitted to practice law in California, New York, Connecticut, Pennsylvania, and before the Supreme Court of the United States.

She practiced family law for many years in New Haven, Connecticut.  She is still regarded by colleagues as an extremely sharp and highly ethical member of the Bar.

She filmed a mediation pilot for Pilgrim Films and Television which has been sold to a major cable network.

Mercer works closely with Kelly Chang Rickert an attorney/mediator and contestant on the 2005 NBC reality show The Law Firm.

Books/Articles
Diana Mercer is the co-author of "Making Divorce Work:  8 Essential Keys for Resolving Conflict and Rebuilding Your Life", with Katie Jane Wennechuk, M.A., Perigee 2010.

Diana Mercer is co-author of the bestselling book Your Divorce Advisor: A Lawyer and Psychologist Guide You Through the Legal and Emotional Landscape of Divorce. Fireside, 2001.

She is also the author of several scholarly articles including:

"Convening Collaborative Cases: Turning Calls Into Clients", Family Mediation News, a publication of the Association for Conflict Resolution, Fall 2003.
"A Therapist's Guide to Understanding Mediation and Child Custody Evaluations", The Therapist: the Magazine of the California Association of Marriage and Family Therapists, Vol.15, Issue 4 July/August 2003.  
"Tips for Mediators from a Mediation Consumer", Southern California Mediation Association Journal, Vol. 11. No. 5, September/October 2002.

Awards
 2006 recipient, Make Mine a $Million Business Award
 2006 recipient of a National Women Business Owners scholarship to the UCLA Anderson School of Business Management Development for Entrepreneurs Program

References

External links
 Peace Talks Mediation Services
 Divorce Mediation & Custody Mediation Blog
Make Mine a $Million website
 Mercer, Diana and Marsha Kline Pruett. Your Divorce Advisor: A Lawyer and Psychologist Guide You Through the Legal and Emotional Landscape of Divorce.
 American Bar Association Q&A with Diana Mercer on Building a Mediation Practice

1964 births
Living people